Atzeneta del Maestrat or Adzaneta is a municipality in the comarca of Alt Maestrat, Castelló, País Valencià.

Municipalities in the Province of Castellón
Alt Maestrat